Boophis sibilans is a species of frog in the family Mantellidae.
It is endemic to Madagascar.
Its natural habitats are subtropical or tropical moist lowland forests and rivers.
It is threatened by habitat loss.

References

Sources

sibilans
Endemic frogs of Madagascar
Amphibians described in 1993
Taxonomy articles created by Polbot